Leon Uso Khamis is a South Sudanese footballer who currently plays as a striker. He is the vice-captain of the national team. He captained the team in the 2012 CECAFA Cup in the absence of Richard Justin and James Moga.

International career
He has made at least two senior appearances for South Sudan against Ethiopia and Kenya in the 2012 CECAFA Cup.

International goals
Scores and results list South Sudan's goal tally first.

Club career
Wau Salaam FC became the first ever South Sudanese football club in the 2012 Kagame Interclub Cup. Although the team was humiliated and faced some heavy defeats, Khamis managed to reserve some pride by becoming the only Wau Salaam and South Sudanese scorer in the 2012 Kagame InterClub Cup, showing his talents amongst a 7-1 thrashing.

References

Living people
1987 births
People from Western Bahr el Ghazal
South Sudanese footballers
South Sudan international footballers
Association football forwards
Wau Salaam F.C. players